Habakkala is a small town in Sri Lanka. It is located within Southern Province. The closest city to Habakkala is Bentota.

See also
List of towns in Southern Province, Sri Lanka

External links

Populated places in Southern Province, Sri Lanka